The Klondike River is a tributary of the Yukon River in Canada that gave its name to the Klondike Gold Rush. The Klondike River rises in the Ogilvie Mountains and flows into the Yukon River at Dawson City.

Its name comes from the Hän word  meaning hammerstone, a tool which was used to hammer down stakes used to set salmon nets.

Gold was discovered in tributaries of the Klondike River in 1896, which started the Klondike gold rush, and is still being mined today.

In Jack London's story "A Relic of the Pliocene" (Collier's Weekly, 1901), this river was mentioned as "Reindeer River". (See Reindeer Lake.)

Gallery

See also
 List of rivers of Yukon

References

Rivers of Yukon
Tributaries of the Yukon River
Hän